Skoroszów may refer to the following places in Poland:
Skoroszów, Lower Silesian Voivodeship (south-west Poland)
Skoroszów, Greater Poland Voivodeship (west-central Poland)